Hathaway, also known as V. Everit Macy and Edith Carpenter Macy Estate, is a historic estate house located at Tannersville in Greene County, New York.  The house was built in 1907 and designed by architects Delano & Aldrich.  It is a large, two story rectangular residence surmounted by a hipped roof with deep overhanging eaves and exposed rafters. It is constructed of concrete block coated in stucco. Also on the property are a carriage house, solarium, garage, and shed. A fishing cabin was once situated on the pond of the property, but is no longer standing. Hathaway was previously run as a Bed and Breakfast lodge, with prominent Broadway actress Maude Adams among its guests.

It was listed on the National Register of Historic Places in 2008.

References

Houses in Greene County, New York
Houses completed in 1907
Houses on the National Register of Historic Places in New York (state)
National Register of Historic Places in Greene County, New York
Delano & Aldrich buildings